The Vatican Tapes is a 2015 American supernatural horror film directed by Mark Neveldine from a screenplay written by Christopher Borrelli and Michael C. Martin, which is in turn based on a story by Chris Morgan and Christopher Borrelli.

The film stars Olivia Taylor Dudley, Michael Peña, Dougray Scott, Djimon Hounsou, Peter Andersson, Kathleen Robertson, and John Patrick Amedori, and was released on July 24, 2015, by Lionsgate.

Plot
In the Vatican, Vicar Imani (Djimon Hounsou) shows Cardinal Bruun (Peter Andersson) the case of Angela Holmes (Olivia Taylor Dudley), a young American woman who is suspected of harboring an evil spirit.

Two months earlier in the United States, Angela is given a surprise birthday party by her father, Roger (Dougray Scott), and boyfriend, Peter "Pete" Smith (John Patrick Amedori). She accidentally cuts herself and is rushed to the hospital, where she briefly meets Father Lozano (Michael Peña). She is injected with a serum that causes an infection; at home, she experiences a seizure and is placed under care at a hospital. A few days later, she is released, but in the taxi on the way home, she violently grabs the wheel, causing an accident that puts her in a coma for 40 days. Just as her life support is about to be switched off, she comes round, seemingly in perfect health.

However, Angela begins to show symptoms of demonic possession when she almost drowns a baby, followed by forcing a detective to commit suicide. Lozano sends her to a psychiatric hospital. A distraught Roger confesses that Angela's mother was a prostitute; she is pregnant just a few months after Roger met her but abandoned the baby at birth leaving Angela to be raised by Roger. Angela's possession becomes worse; she taunts her psychiatrist, Dr. Richards (Kathleen Robertson), eventually culminating in her speaking in Aramaic that induces hysteria and mass suicide in her fellow patients. Deciding that nothing can save her, the hospital releases her.

The movie returns to present day. Bruun concludes that Angela is possessed by the Antichrist due to the presence of the ravens around her, which are agents of Satan, and instructs Imani to stay back while he heads to the United States to cure her. An exorcism he plans involves a Eucharist, where Angela reacts by vomiting blood and spitting three eggs, meant to symbolize a perverted Trinity. Bruun also comments that her birth from a prostitute perverts the virgin birth of Jesus Christ. Bruun then realizes that the Antichrist is already a part of Angela; killing him would mean Angela's death as well. Just after Bruun kills Angela, she rises up as the resurrected Antichrist, mirroring the Resurrection of Jesus, and kills Bruun, Roger, and Pete. She spares Lozano and tells him to inform the Vatican that the Antichrist is roaming the Earth.

Three months later, Lozano, having been released from the hospital, visits the Vatican and is allowed access to the archives by Imani. He is shown footage of what has happened since: Angela returns as the only "survivor" of the exorcism besides Lozano and is now performing miracles to gather followers. The film ends with her entering a large arena to greet her followers by stretching out her arms.

Cast
 Olivia Taylor Dudley as Angela
 Michael Peña as Father Oscar Lozano
 Dougray Scott as Roger, Angela's father
 Djimon Hounsou as Vicar Imani
 Peter Andersson as Cardinal Mattias Bruun
 Kathleen Robertson as Dr. Richards, Angela's psychiatrist
 John Patrick Amedori as Peter "Pete" Smith, Angela's boyfriend
 Michael Paré as Detective Harris
 Alex Sparrow as Resident Kulik
 Cas Anvar as Dr. Fahti

Production
Principal photography began in July 2013 in Los Angeles.

Release

Box office
The Vatican Tapes opened theatrically on July 24, 2015 in 427 venues, earning $832,271 in its first weekend, ranking fifteenth in the United States box office and last among the week's new releases. The film finished its theatrical run four weeks later, on August 20, having grossed $1,784,763 domestically. Overseas, the film made $11,680,747, giving the film a worldwide total of $13,465,510, based on an estimated $13 million budget.

Critical reception

The film received generally negative reviews from critics. On Rotten Tomatoes, the film has a rating of 20%, based on 45 reviews, with an average rating of 3.99/10. The site's critical consensus reads, "A loud, rote exorcism thriller that presents nothing new to an already overpopulated subgenre." On Metacritic, the film has a score of 38 out of 100, based on 12 critics, indicating "generally unfavorable reviews." Audiences surveyed by CinemaScore gave the film an average grade of "C" on an A+ to F scale. IGN awarded it a score of 2.5 out of ten, saying "It exists without any real scares or chills, and only the smallest attempt to differentiate itself."

References

External links
 
 
 
 

2015 films
2015 horror films
2010s supernatural horror films
American supernatural horror films
2010s English-language films
Aramaic-language films
Films about exorcism
Films produced by Gary Lucchesi
Films produced by Tom Rosenberg
Films scored by Joseph Bishara
Films set in Los Angeles
Films set in Vatican City
Films shot in Los Angeles
Films with screenplays by Chris Morgan
Lakeshore Entertainment films
Lionsgate films
2010s American films